Watir is a sub-district located in the Al-Misrakh District, Taiz Governorate, Yemen. Watir had a population of 4,211 according to the 2004 census.

Villages
Zahirat Watir village.
Al-Masajeed village.
'Aqin village.
Al-thawjun village.
Al-Muzahad village.
Al-Mahja' village.
Wadi al-'Arsh village.
Dharhabah village.

References

Sub-districts in Al-Misrakh District